Romano Scavolini (born 18 June 1940) is an Italian film director and the younger brother of screenwriter Sauro Scavolini.

Career
He has been directing since the 1960s. Most of his films are shot independently and with an experimental style. His best known horror films are Nightmare (1981), a gruesome horror film that was banned as a video nasty in the UK, and his 1972 A White Dress for Marialé.

Filmography
 The Devastated One (I devastati) – 1958/1959
 Blind Fly (A mosca cieca) (Ricordati di Haron) – 1966
 The Dress Rehearsal (La prova generale) – 1968
 Entonce – 1969
  (Lo stato d'assedio) (also known as State of Siege – Besieged) – 1969
 The long march (La lunga marcia)
 A White Dress for Marialé; aka Un bianco vestito per Marialé (also known as Spirits of Death) – 1972
 Heart (Cuore) – 1973
 Your Honor (Servo suo) – 1973
 The Savage Hunt (also known as Condor's Run) – 1980
 Nightmares in a Damaged Brain (also known as Nightmare – Blood Splash) – 1981
 Dog Tags – 1988
 Ustica: a thorn in the heart (Ustica. Una spina nel cuore) – 2001/2002/2003
 "Che" The Last Hours (Le ultime ore del Che) – 2003
 Apocalisse delle scimmie – A TRILOGY – 2004/2005/2006/2007/2008
 Two Families – 2007
 Two Days – 2012

as interviewed:
 Ban the Sadist Videos! – 2005 
 The Diabolikal Super-Kriminal'' – 2007

References

External links
 
 Official website

1940 births
Italian film directors
Living people